Thomas Ingram may refer to:

Politicians
Thomas Ingram (MP for Guildford) (fl. 1415), English politician, MP for Guildford
 Sir Thomas Ingram (Royalist) (1614–1672), English politician
 Thomas Ingram (California politician), California's 3rd State Senate district senator, 1916–1929

Others
 Thomas Ingram (cricketer), late 18th century English cricketer
 Thomas Lewis Ingram (1807–1868), British merchant and colonial administrator
 Tom Ingram (born 1993), British racing driver